The 1957 California Golden Bears football team was an American football team that represented the University of California, Berkeley in the Pacific Coast Conference (PCC) during the 1957 NCAA University Division football season. In their first year under head coach Pete Elliott, the Golden Bears compiled a 1–9 record (1–6 in PCC, seventh), and were outscored 176 to 109.

The team's statistical leaders included Joe Kapp with 580 passing yards and Jack Hart with 396 rushing yards and 276 receiving yards. Kapp was later inducted into the College Football Hall of Fame.

Schedule

Roster

References

External links
Game program: California at Washington State – September 28, 1957

California
California Golden Bears football seasons
California Golden Bears football